John Merlo (September 9, 1912 – August 9, 1992) was an American politician, who served for seven terms as an Illinois State Representative, for three years as an Illinois state senator, as well as for two years as a Chicago City Council alderman for Chicago's 44th Ward.

Biography
John Merlo was born September 9, 1912, in Chicago to Mike Merlo, a leader of Unione Siciliana. In 1922, he moved from the south side to Lake View where he resided for the rest of his life. He joined the Chicago Park District in 1933, where he worked for decades. For a period of time, he was also the Secretary Edward J. Barrett's 44th Ward Regular Democratic Organization.

He was appointed to the Chicago City Council in 1981 after the resignation of Bruce Young. He won a special election to win served for two years before he stepped down. He was succeeded by Bernie Hansen.

He died August 9, 1992, at Northwestern Memorial Hospital. He was survived by his wife, Meryle, and three children.

References

1912 births
1992 deaths
Chicago City Council members
Democratic Party members of the Illinois House of Representatives
Democratic Party Illinois state senators
20th-century American politicians